Andy McMaster (11 May 1914 – 12 May 1998) was an Australian rules footballer who played for the Footscray Football Club in the Victorian Football League (VFL).

Notes

External links 

1914 births
1998 deaths
Australian rules footballers from Victoria (Australia)
Western Bulldogs players